Ağaşirinoba (also, Agashirinoba) is a village and municipality in the Khachmaz Rayon of Azerbaijan.  It has a population of 1,541.  The municipality consists of the villages of Ağaşirinoba, Qıraqlı, and Manafoba.

References 

Populated places in Khachmaz District